The Slate Creek Bridge is a riveted steel Parker pony truss bridge spanning the Blue River  north of Silverthorne, Colorado. It is named after the road it carries, Slate Creek Road. The bridge was rehabilitated in 1951. This rare example of an uncommon truss type was listed on the National Register of Historic Places in 1985.

It was fabricated by the American Bridge Co. and installed in 1924 by bridge contractors Rogers and Pickard.  It features "a poured-in-place concrete deck and buttress outriggers at the panel points."

The only other riveted Parker pony truss bridge known to survive in Colorado. (The San Francisco Creek Bridge, built in 1926, has been moved from its original location).

References

Bridges completed in 1924
Road bridges on the National Register of Historic Places in Colorado
Transportation buildings and structures in Summit County, Colorado
National Register of Historic Places in Summit County, Colorado
Steel bridges in the United States
Parker truss bridges in the United States